Norway has a notable  film industry.

The first domestically produced Norwegian film was a short about fishermen, Fiskerlivets farer ("The Dangers in a Fisherman's Life"), dating from 1907. The first feature was released in 1911, produced by Halfman Nobel Roede.  In 1931 Tancred Ibsen, grandson of playwright Henrik Ibsen, presented Norway's first feature-length sound film, Den store barnedåpen ("The Great Christening").  Throughout the 1930s, Ibsen dominated the nation's film industry. Fellow film director Leif Sinding was also very successful during this period.  Ibsen produced conventional melodramas more or less on the model of Hollywood films.

In the early 21st century, several Norwegian film directors have had the opportunity to go to Hollywood to direct various independent films. As of 2011, nearly 900 films had been produced in Norway, with a third of these being made within the last 15 years.

Notable films

1920s
Pan (1922)
Troll-elgen (1927)
Laila (1929)

1930s
Den store barnedåpen (1931)
 To levende og en død (1937)
 Gjest Baardsen (1939)

1940s
Tante Pose (1940)
Bastard (1940)
Tørres Snørtevold (1940)
Den forsvundne pølsemaker (1941)
Det grodde fram - Trondheim 1940 - 1945 (1947)

1950s
Kon-Tiki (1950)
Aldri annet enn bråk (1954)
Ni Liv (Nine Lives) (1957)
Fjols til fjells (Fools in the Mountains) (1957)
De dødes Tjern (Lakes of the Dead) (1958)
Jakten (The Chasers) (1959)

1960s
Mannen som ikke kunne le (The Man Who Could Not Laugh) (1968)

1970s
Olsenbanden tar gull (1972)
Flåklypa Grand Prix (The Pinchcliffe Grand Prix) (1975)
Lasse & Geir (1976)

1980s
Orions belte (Orion's Belt) (1985)
Ofelaš (aka. Veiviseren, Pathfinder) (1987)

1990s
Døden på Oslo S (Oslo, Central Station) (1990)
Mørketid (1994)
Kjærlighetens kjøtere (Zero Kelvin) (1995)
Søndagsengler (The Other Side of Sunday) (1996)
Insomnia (1997)
Junk Mail (1997)

2000s
Elling (2001)
Heftig og begeistret (2001)
Mongoland (2001)
Villmark (Dark Woods) (2003)
Salmer fra Kjøkkenet (Kitchen Stories) (2003)
Buddy (2003)
Hawaii, Oslo (2004)
Den brysomme mannen (The Bothersome Man) (2006)
Fritt Vilt (Cold Prey) (2006, sequels in 2008 and 2010)
Reprise (2006)
Den siste revejakta (2008)
Rovdyr (Manhunt) (2008)
Kautokeino-opprøret (The Kautokeino Rebellion) (2008)
Max Manus (2008)
Død Snø (Dead Snow) (2009)
Knerten (Twigson) (2009)

2010s
 Trolljegeren (Trollhunter) (2010)
 Kongen av Bastøy (King of Devil's Island) (2010)
En ganske snill mann (A Somewhat Gentle Man) (2010)
Hodejegerne (Headhunters) (2011)
Oslo, August 31st (2011)
Kon-Tiki (2012)
Bølgen (The Wave) (2015)
Kongens nei (The King's Choice) (2016)
Utøya: July 22 (2018)
Thelma (2017)

2020s
Verdens verste menneske (The Worst Person in the World) (2021)
 Troll (2022)

Notable short films
The Spirit of Norway (1988)
Året gjennom Børfjord (A Year Along the Abandoned Road) (1991)
De beste går først (United We Stand) (2002)
Sniffer (2006)
Den danske dikteren (The Danish Poet) (2006)

Actors
Liv Ullmann
Kristofer Hivju
Ingrid Bolsø Berdal
Henki Kolstad
Maria Bonnevie
Anders Baasmo Christiansen
Wenche Foss
Harald Heide-Steen Jr.
Kristoffer Joner
Helge Jordal
Alfred Maurstad
Toralv Maurstad
Arve Opsahl
Sverre Anker Ousdal
Bjørn Sundquist
Tobias Santelmann
Trond Espen Seim
Rolv Wesenlund
Pia Tjelta
Aksel Hennie
Ane Dahl Torp
Nicolai Cleve Broch
Morten Rudå

Directors

Joachim Trier
André Øvredal
Martin Asphaug
Anja Breien
Edith Carlmar
Ivo Caprino
Eva Dahr
Olav Dalgard
Karoline Frogner
Nils Gaup
Erik Gustavson
Bent Hamer
Gill Holland
Marius Holst
Tancred Ibsen
Jens Lien
Vibeke Løkkeberg
Hans Petter Moland
Marja Bål Nango
Petter Næss
Sara Margrethe Oskal
Erik Poppe
Øyvind Sandberg
Erik Skjoldbjærg
Arne Skouen
Ola Solum
Liv Ullmann
Trond Espen Seim
Roar Uthaug
Petter Vennerød
Tommy Wirkola
Svend Wam
Harald Zwart

Other notable persons in the Norwegian film industry
John M. Jacobsen (producer)
Philip Øgaard (cinematographer)
Svein Krøvel (cinematographer)

Awards
The Norwegian equivalent of the Academy Awards is the Amanda award, which is presented during the annual Norwegian Film Festival in Haugesund. The prize was created in 1985. The Amanda award is presented in following categories: Best Norwegian Film, Best Directing, Best Male Actor, Best Female Actress, Best Film for Children and Youth, Best Screenplay, Best Short Film, Best Documentary (however, a documentary can also win the Best Film award), Best Foreign Film and an honorary award.

The documentary Kon-Tiki by Thor Heyerdahl received the Academy Award for Documentary Feature at the 24th Academy Awards in 1951. It is the only feature film in Norwegian history to win an Academy Award. In 2006 the Norwegian/Canadian animated short film The Danish Poet, directed by Norwegian Torill Kove and narrated by Norwegian screen legend Liv Ullmann, won an Academy Award for Animated Short Film, and became the second Norwegian production to receive an Academy Award.

As of 2013, five films from Norway have been nominated for the Academy Award for Best Foreign Language Film: Nine Lives (1957), The Pathfinder (1987), The Other Side of Sunday (1996), Elling (2001) and Kon-Tiki (2012).

Film festivals
Arctic Film Festival, Svalbard
Bergen International Film Festival, Bergen
Kosmorama – Trondheim International Film Festival, Trondheim
Kristiansand International Children's Film Festival, Kristiansand
Norwegian International Film Festival, Haugesund
Tromsø International Film Festival, Tromsø

Film commissions
Western Norway Film Commission, Bergen

Film schools
Film schools include:
The Norwegian Filmschool in Lillehammer.

Other alternatives for more theoretical higher education in film include:
Bachelor degree in Film- and TV-production at University of Bergen.
Bachelor degree in Film Science at Norwegian University of Science and Technology.

There are also several more practical private film collages:
Studies in Film- and TV-production at Noroff Institute
Studies in Film- and TV-production at Nordic Institute of Stage and Studio (NISS)
Studies in Film- and TV-production at Westerdals School of Communication

See also
 Cinema of the world

References